The 1896 A&M Aggies football team represented the Agricultural and Mechanical College of Texas—now known as Texas A&M University—as an independent during the 1896 college football season. Led by Andrew M. Soule and Horace W. South in their first and only season as co-head coaches, the Aggies compiled a record of 2–0–1.

Schedule

References

Additional sources
 "1896 Schedule/Results." Texas A&M football record, 1896. Aggie Athletics. Retrieved on May 2, 2008.

Texas AandM
Texas A&M Aggies football seasons
College football undefeated seasons
Texas AandM Aggies football